The 2021–22 Louisiana Tech Lady Techsters basketball team represented Louisiana Tech University during the 2021–22 NCAA Division I women's basketball season. The team was led by sixth-year head coach Brooke Stoehr, and played their home games at the Thomas Assembly Center in Ruston, Louisiana as a member of Conference USA.

Schedule and results

|-
!colspan=12 style=|Non-conference regular season

|-
!colspan=12 style=|CUSA regular season

|-
!colspan=12 style=| CUSA Tournament

|-
!colspan=12 style=| WNIT

See also
 2021–22 Louisiana Tech Bulldogs basketball team

Notes

References

Louisiana Tech Lady Techsters basketball seasons
Louisiana Tech
Louisiana Tech Lady Techsters basketball
Louisiana Tech Lady Techsters basketball
Louisiana Tech